Peers Coetmore (born Kathleen Peers Coetmore Jones; October 1905 – July 1976) was an English cellist. She spent her early years in Spilsby in Lincolnshire.

Early life
Peers was born Kathleen Peers Coetmore Jones. She won the Royal Academy of Music's Piatti Prize for cellists in 1924.

Career
She married the composer E.J. Moeran in 1945 and was the dedicatee of his Cello Concerto and his Cello Sonata. She gave the premiere performance of both these works (the Sonata with the pianist Charles Lynch). Her recordings of both works are available on CD on the Lyrita imprint [UK].

Among her students was Doreen Carwithen.

After Moeran's death in 1950, she married (Maurice) Walter Knott (1922–2003) and lived in Melbourne, Australia, where she taught at the Victorian College of the Arts.  She died in July 1976.  In her will, she made a bequest of $20,000 to the College "...for the purpose of founding a Scholarship to be known as "The Peers Coetmore Scholarship" to be awarded from time to time to the cello student adjudged to be the worthiest student by the Board of Studies to enable such student to engage in the further study of the cello for a period of one, two or three years and whether within the Commonwealth of Australia or overseas as the said Board of Studies may in its unfettered discretion determine". The first recipient of this Scholarship was Jacqueline Johnson.

She also bequeathed to the College her 1723 Goffriller cello and some of Moeran's unpublished musical scores, including his unfinished Second Symphony in E-flat.

After her death, Walter Knott arranged for Wesley College, Melbourne to name its orchestra the Coetmore Orchestra in her honour.  Walter Knott was particularly associated with the college and bequeathed his own estate to it.

Notes

English classical cellists
Australian classical cellists
1905 births
1976 deaths
People from Spilsby
20th-century classical musicians
20th-century English musicians
20th-century Australian musicians
20th-century cellists